Hal Pereira (April 29, 1905 – December 17, 1983) was an American art director, production designer, and occasional architect.

Pereira was born in Chicago, Illinois, the son of Sarah (Friedberg) and Saul Pereira. In the 1940s through the 1960s he worked on more than 200 films as an art director and production designer. He was nominated for 23 Oscars, having won only one for his work on The Rose Tattoo. He served, along with Earl Hedrick, as artistic director of the popular TV series Bonanza.
Pereira started out in theater design in Chicago before moving to Los Angeles and working for Paramount Studios as a unit art director. In 1944 he was art designer for the film noir Double Indemnity. By 1950, he was supervising art director for the studio, a position at which he remained until its reorganization by the Gulf+Western oil firm in the late 1960s. There, he worked on such films as the classic Western Shane and The Greatest Show on Earth, which won the Oscar for Best Picture. In 1955 Pereira won the Oscar for best art direction for a black and white film for The Rose Tattoo. In addition, he was the art director on almost all of the important Alfred Hitchcock films of the 1950s.

Pereira was educated at the University of Illinois and is brother of architect (and occasional film art director) William L. Pereira.

He died in Los Angeles, California.

References

External links

American art directors
American production designers
Best Art Direction Academy Award winners
1905 births
1983 deaths
American people of Portuguese-Jewish descent